Ishan, Iran may refer to:
 Ayjan
 Eshen
 Eyshan